Marko Stanojević (born 4 May 1997) is a Serbian footballer who plays as a defensive midfielder for Rad.

Club career

Napredak Kruševac
Stanojević passed Napredak Kruševac youth academy. He has joined the first team for the 2014–15 season. He signed a two-year scholarship contract with club in summer 2015, but continued playing as a captain of youth team until 2016. He made his senior debut in 27 fixture match of 2015–16 Serbian First League season, against Sloga Petrovac, replacing Bohdan Sichkaruk in 63 minute of the match. In summer 2017, Stanojević signed a three-year professional contract with Napredak. In summer 2018, Stanojević released by the club.

Loan to Temnić
In summer 2016, Stanojević loaned at one-year dual registration to the Serbian League East side Temnić. During the 2016–17 campaign, Stanojević collected 24 appearances as a bonus player, helping the team to win the competition and make promotion to the Serbian First League. At the beginning of new season, Stanojević returned to the club at six-month loan deal. He was usually used the in first squad during the first half of the 2017–18 season, having ordered with number 10 jersey. In the mid-season, Stanojević extended a loan deal until the end of the 2017–18 Serbian First League campaign.

Dinamo Vranje & Trayal Kruševac
Stanojević joined Dinamo Vranje on 8 August 2018 where he played until the end of the year, before joining Trayal Kruševac in mid January 2019.

Career statistics

Honours
Napredak Kruševac
Serbian First League: 2015–16
Temnić
Serbian First League: 2016–17

References

External links
 Marko Stanojević at serbiacorner.com
 
 

1997 births
Sportspeople from Kruševac
Living people
Serbian footballers
Association football midfielders
FK Napredak Kruševac players
FK Temnić players
FK Dinamo Vranje players
FK Trayal Kruševac players
Tarxien Rainbows F.C. players
FK Rad players
Serbian SuperLiga players
Serbian First League players
Maltese Premier League players
Serbian expatriate footballers
Expatriate footballers in Malta
Serbian expatriate sportspeople in Malta